Applebutter Hill is a low mountain in Lehigh County, Pennsylvania. Applebutter Hill is located to the west of Center Valley, and is north of Coopersburg. 

It is part of the Reading Prong of the Appalachian Mountains.

References 

Landforms of Lehigh County, Pennsylvania
Mountains of Pennsylvania